House Party 3: Original Motion Picture Soundtrack is the soundtrack to the 1994 film House Party 3. It was released on January 11, 1994, through Select Records and consisted of a blend of hip hop and R&B. The soundtrack was the least successful of the three, making it to number 55 on the Top R&B/Hip-Hop Albums, nor was the soundtrack's only charting single "Butt Booty Naked" by AMG. Six songs on the album were performed by the film's stars, Kid 'n Play; to date it has been the last original material the group has released.

Track listing
"Bounce" – 4:17 (Kid 'n Play) 
"Wakes You Up" – 3:26 (Immature)
"Two Fingers" – 5:12 (Kid 'n Play)  
"How About Some Hardcore" – 4:32 (M.O.P.)
"Drop Down" – 3:48 (Sylk Smoov)
"Rock the House" – 3:50 (R.A.S. Posse) 
"The Illest" – 3:31 (Red Hot Lover Tone) 
"Butt Booty Naked" – 3:59 (AMG)  
"Make Noize" – 3:44 (Kid 'n Play) 
"How'm I Doin'?" – 4:14 (Kid 'n Play) 
"Void" – 4:02 (Kid 'n Play) 
"We Got It Goin' On" – 3:45 (To da Core) 
"Here and Now" – 4:17 (Kid 'n Play) 
"I Just Love the Man" – 4:21 (Everyday Emotions)
"The Cure" – 3:32 (Nerissa)

Comedy film soundtracks
Hip hop soundtracks
Albums produced by Courtney Branch
Albums produced by the Beatnuts
1994 soundtrack albums
Select Records soundtracks
Contemporary R&B soundtracks
House Party (film series)